The 1992 UCI Road World Cup was the fourth edition of the UCI Road World Cup. From the 1991 edition, the Grand Prix de la Libération was dropped and no longer ran and the Grand Prix des Amériques became the Grand Prix Téléglobe. The final individual time trial event, held in 1991 around Bergamo and counting as both the Grand Prix des Nations and the Trofeo Baracchi, was chosen to be the Grand Prix des Nations proper, although held in Palma de Mallorca rather than in France.

Races

Final standings

Riders

Teams

References
 Complete results from Cyclingbase.com
 Final classification for individuals and teams from memoire-du-cyclisme.net

 
 
UCI Road World Cup (men)